Le Diable amoureux (also known as Satanella or Love and Hell) is a ballet-pantomime in three acts and eight scenes, originally choreographed by Joseph Mazilier to the music of Napoléon Henri Reber and François Benoist. The libretto by Jules-Henri Vernoy de Saint-Georges is based on Jacques Cazotte's 1772 occult romance The Devil in Love. The work was first presented by the Ballet of the Royal Academy of Music (Paris Opera Ballet) in Paris on 23 September 1840, with Pauline Leroux (as Uriel), Mazilier (as Alvaro, for ballet his name is Frederic), and Louise Fitz-James (as Lilia).

Revivals

Revival by Marius Petipa and Jean-Antoine Petipa for Russia's Imperial Ballet under the title Satanella, with music orchestrated and revised by Konstantin Liadov. Principal dancers: Yelena Andreyanova as Satanella, and Marius Petipa as Count Fabio.
Revival by Petipa for the Imperial Ballet with additional music by Cesare Pugni. Principal dancers:Praskovia Lebedeva as Satanella, and Lev Ivanov as Count Fabio.
Revival by Petipa for the Imperial Ballet with additional music by Cesare Pugni. Principal dancers: Alexandra Vergina as Satanella, and Lev Ivanov as Count Fabio.
Revival of Petipa by Ivan Chliustin and Nicola Domashov for the Imperial Ballet. Principal dancers: Lyubov Roslavleva.

Gallery

Notes

References

 Garafola, Lynn / Petipa, Marius. The Diaries of Marius Petipa. Trans, Ed., and introduction by Lynn Garafola. Published in Studies in Dance History. 3.1 (Spring 1992).

Ballets by Joseph Mazilier
Ballets by Jules-Henri Vernoy de Saint-Georges
Ballets by Napoléon Henri Reber
Ballets by François Benoist
1840 ballet premieres
Ballets premiered at the Paris Opera Ballet